Juniper Publishers is a publisher of various academic journals. It has a postal address in Irvine, California, USA but also has employees in Hyderabad, India.
Juniper Publishers has been included on Beall's List of potential predatory open-access publishers, and has faced other criticisms of its publishing practices.

Activities 
Juniper Publishers has been active at least since 2015. The company uses an Open Access model of publishing, which charges the authors. Articles are distributed online and free of cost or other barriers. The company claims that articles are peer reviewed before publication.
In 2022 the company published about 75 journals in the fields of clinical and medical science, life sciences, chemistry, engineering, and pharma. As of 2022, most of its journals do not have a scientific editor in chief. Juniper Publishers' journals are not listed in Clarivate's Web of Science, which calculates Impact factors for scientific journals; nevertheless Juniper Publishers displays so-called Impact Factors for its journals, whose origins are not explained. Its journals are not indexed in National Library of Medicine's MEDLINE, but articles are included in PubMed Central and may be accessed through the PubMed access platform.

Criticism 
Juniper Publishers was listed in Beall's List of potential predatory open-access publishers. The company has been criticized for sending out email spam to scientists, calling out for papers, and for publishing a paper which violates research integrity (missing conflict of interest statement, missing informed consent by patients, and plagiarism).

In 2020, two biologists published a non-sensical study in Juniper's Oceanography & Fisheries Open Access Journal, which amongst other included the claim that barn swallows and flying fish are sister lineages, thus demonstrating that the peer review promised by the publisher and paid by the customers was non-existent or deeply flawed.

Keith Taber, Emeritus Professor of Science Education at the University of Cambridge, analysed several articles from an author named Rahul Hajare. These articles were characterized by "titles not reflecting the paper, abstracts that do not actually discuss the study, conflation of unrelated topics, nonsensical sentences that any editor or reviewer should ask to be revised/corrected, glaring inconsistencies, and citing only his own publications", and had been published in Juniper's journals Advanced Research in Gastroenterology & Hepatology, Trends in Technical & Scientific Research, Advances in Biotechnology & Microbiology, and Organic & Medicinal Chemistry International Journal.

Journals

References

Academic publishing companies
Open access publishers
Companies based in Hyderabad, India